Gadi Zelniker (12 March 1944 – 1 March 2016) was an Israeli footballer. He played in three matches for the Israel national football team in 1965.

References

External links
 

1944 births
2016 deaths
Israeli footballers
Israel international footballers
Association footballers not categorized by position